Eicha na perivolaki, is a Greeks folkloric tune (syrtos or Kasik Havasi).

Original form
The original form of the  syrtos  was popular in Messinia.

References

Greek music
Greek songs
Year of song unknown
Songwriter unknown